Bava Marudula Saval is a 1988 ( Brothers-in-law's Challenge) Telugu-language action drama film, produced by Polamarasetty Appa Rao under the Quality Pictures banner and directed by C. V. Ganesh. It stars Rajendra Prasad, Dr. Rajasekhar, Ramya Krishna  and music composed by Sivaji Raja.

Plot
The film begins with two soulmates Jai Kumar (Rajendra Prasad) & Vijaykanth (Dr. Rajasekhar). Ongoing Jai becomes a Police Officer and Vijay an Advocate. As follows, they turn their friendship into a relationship by coupling up with one other's sisters Ramya (Ramya Krishna) & Kalpana (Kalpana) respectively. Here, Vijay has one more friend Ranjeet Kumar (Sarath Babu), a multimillionaire whom Jai suspects as a criminal. Meanwhile, Ranjeet is indicted in the crime of slaying his secretary Rupa (Jeevitha Rajashekar) who dies in a suspicious situation. At Present, Jai takes Ranjeet into custody and Vijay picks up the case as defense counsel when a conflict arises between them which disturbs their family life too. All at once, Jai & Vijay realizes the real culprit is Parasuram (again Sarath Babu) one that resembles Ranjeet. At last, brothers-in-law unite, ceases the baddies and acquits Ranjeet. Finally, the movie ends on a happy note by 3 friends continuing their friendship.

Cast
Rajendra Prasad as Inspector Jai Kumar
Dr.Rajasekhar as Advocate Vijayakanth
Sarath Babu as Ranjeeth Kumar & Parasuram (dual role)
Ramya Krishna as Ramya
Kalpana as Kalpana
Jeevitha Rajasekhar as Deepa
J. V. Somayajulu 
Vankayala Satyanarayana 
Kasi Viswanath as Bulliraju
Potti Prasad as Hanumanthu 
Dham

Soundtrack

Music composed by Sivaji Raja. Lyrics were written by Veturi. Music released on LEO Audio Company.

References

1988 films
1980s Telugu-language films